Countess Louise de Mérode (Louise Caroline Ghislaine de Merode-Westerloo; 22 May 1819 – 1 March 1868) was a member of the House of Merode by birth and Princess della Cisterna by marriage.

Life and family
Born in Brussels, she was the eldest of seven children born to Count Werner de Merode and Countess Victoire van Spangen d'Uyternesse . Her younger sister, Antoinette de Merode, was the future wife of Charles III, Prince of Monaco.

On 28 September 1846 at Brussels, she married Carlo Emanuele dal Pozzo, 5th Prince della Cisterna, an Italian nobleman from one of the few aristocratic families in the Kingdom of Sardinia to bear the title of "prince" as a noble title. It was a double wedding with her younger sister, Antoinette. Carlo Emanuele dal Pozzo had been exiled from Sardinia in 1821 after having conspired against King Vittorio Emanuele I, but the couple returned to Turin in 1848.

In 1867, her daughter Maria married Prince Amadeo of Savoy, The Duke of Aosta, second son of King Victor Emmanuel II of Italy and his wife Archduchess Adelaide of Austria. Prince Amadeo briefly occupied the Spanish throne from 1870 to 1873.

Upon the death of Louise's husband in 1864, their daughter Maria inherited his titles and properties, eventually passing them on to her son. In 1868, Louise died at the Palazzo dal Pozzo della Cisterna in Turin.

Issue
 Princess Maria Vittoria dal Pozzo (1847–1876); married Prince Amedeo of Savoy, 1st Duke of Aosta; After the death of Carlo Emanuele, Maria Vittoria inherited her father's titles, which passed through her to the Aosta cadet branch of the House of Savoy.
 Princess Beatrice Giuseppa Antonia Luisa dal Pozzo (1851–1864); died during childhood. Buried at Chapel of Madonna of Pietà, Reano.

Ancestry

References

|-

1819 births
1868 deaths
Nobility from Brussels
Merode family
Italian nobility
House of Pozzo
Princesses della Cisterna